Iran (officially the Islamic Republic of Iran)   competed at the inaugural World Beach Games in Doha, Qatar from 12 to 16 October 2019. In total, athletes representing Iran originally won one gold medal, one silver medal and one bronze medal. In February 2021 however, Iran's gold medallist, Pouya Rahmani, was found guilty of doping offences committed at the Games. He was stripped of his medal.

Medal summary

Medalists

References 

Nations at the 2019 World Beach Games
World Beach Games